Visa requirements for Belizean citizens are administrative entry restrictions by the authorities of other states placed on citizens of Belize. As of 11 January 2022, Belizean citizens had visa-free or visa on arrival access to 101 countries and territories, ranking the Belizean passport 52nd overall, and last among Central American countries, in terms of travel freedom according to the Henley Passport Index.

Visa requirements map

Visa requirements

Territories and disputed areas
Visa requirements for Belizean citizens for visits to various territories, disputed areas and restricted zones:

Non-visa restrictions

See also

Visa policy of Belize
Belizean passport

References and Notes
References

Notes

Belize
Foreign relations of Belize